Presqualene diphosphate synthase (SSL-1 (gene)) is an enzyme with systematic name (2E,6E)-farnesyl-diphosphate:(2E,6E)-farnesyl-diphosphate farnesyltransferase (presqualene diphosphate forming). This enzyme catalyses the following chemical reaction

 2 (2E,6E)-farnesyl diphosphate  presqualene diphosphate + diphosphate

This enzyme is isolated from the green alga Botryococcus braunii BOT22.

References

External links 

EC 2.5.1